Peter Dawo (born 1964) is a former Kenya international football forward who played for clubs in Kenya, Egypt and Oman.

Club career
Born in Kericho, Dawo began playing football in the local league for MTI. After performing well with MTI, he was noticed by Gor Mahia F.C. and signed for the club in 1987.

In his first season with Gor Mahia, Dawo helped the club win a domestic league and cup double. He also led the club to its first and only African Cup Winners' Cup title in 1987, scoring 10 goals in the competition. Following these exploits, Dawo finished seventh in the voting for 1987 African Footballer of the Year.

In 1990, Dawo signed for Egyptian league side Arab Contractors SC. He only managed one goal during the season, and moved to Omani side Al-Seeb the following season.

Dawo returned to play for Gor Mahia in the remainder of the 1991 season, winning the domestic league. He would retire from playing after the season.

International career
Dawo made several appearances for the Kenya national football team, including five FIFA World Cup qualifying matches. He played for Kenya at the 1988 and 1990 African Cup of Nations finals.

Personal
Dawo is the uncle of Kenya international footballer Patrick Oboya.

References

External links

1964 births
Living people
Kenyan footballers
Association football forwards
Gor Mahia F.C. players
Al Mokawloon Al Arab SC players
Al-Seeb Club players
Egyptian Premier League players
Kenya international footballers
1988 African Cup of Nations players
1990 African Cup of Nations players
Kenyan expatriate footballers
Expatriate footballers in Oman
Expatriate footballers in Egypt
Kenyan expatriate sportspeople in Oman
Kenyan expatriate sportspeople in Egypt